Ovatella is a genus of gastropods belonging to the family Ellobiidae.

The species of this genus are found in Europe, Northern Africa and Northern America.

Species
Ovatella aequalis 
Ovatella boettgeri 
Ovatella firminii 
Ovatella gracilis 
Ovatella kutschigiana 
Ovatella microstoma 
Ovatella pisolina 
Ovatella vulcani 
Synonyms
 Ovatella micheli (Mittre, 1841): synonym of Auriculinella bidentata (Montagu, 1808): synonym of Leucophytia bidentata (Montagu, 1808)
 Ovatella myosotis (Draparnaud, 1801): synonym of Myosotella myosotis (Draparnaud, 1801)
 Ovatella polita Bivona Ant., 1832: synonym of Megastomia conoidea (Brocchi, 1814) (dubious synonym)
 Ovatella punctata Bivona-Bernardi, 1832: synonym of Ovatella firminii (Payraudeau, 1827)

References

External links
 Bivona Bernardi Ant. (1832). Caratteri d'un nuovo genere di conchiglie della famiglia delle Plicacee del signor De Lamarck. Effemeride scientifiche e letterarie per la Sicilia 1(1): 58-59
 Martins, A. M. de F. (1999). On the generic separation of Ovatella Bivona, 1832 and Myosotella Monterosato (Pulmonata, Ellobiidae). Iberus. 17(2): 59-75
 Gofas, S.; Le Renard, J.; Bouchet, P. (2001). Mollusca. in: Costello, M.J. et al. (eds), European Register of Marine Species: a check-list of the marine species in Europe and a bibliography of guides to their identification. Patrimoines Naturels. 50: 180-213

Ellobiidae